Prior to the 2010 Dutch general election, contesting parties put forward party lists.

Christian Democratic Appeal
Jan Peter Balkenende
Ank Bijleveld-Schouten
Maxime Verhagen
Marja van Bijsterveldt
Ab Klink
Jan Kees de Jager
Joop Atsma
Elly Blanksma-van den Heuvel
Gerda Verburg
Sybrand van Haersma Buma
Mirjam Sterk
Ger Koopmans
Henk Jan Ormel
Jack de Vries 
Eddy van Hijum
Margreeth Smilde
Madeleine van Toorenburg
Coşkun Çörüz
Kathleen Ferrier
Hanke Bruins Slot
Ad Koppejan
Raymond Knops
Sander de Rouwe
Bas Jan van Bochove
Rikus Jager
Jan Schinkelshoek
Jan Jacob van Dijk
Maarten Haverkamp
Pieter Omtzigt
Jack Biskop
Michiel Holtackers
Sabine Uitslag
Marieke van der Werf
Joost Verheijen
Cisca Joldersma
Martijn van Helvert
Hein Pieper
Jan Mastwijk
Jaco Geurts
Mustafa Amhaouch
Arnoud Strijbis
Alwin de Jong
Anke van Extel-van Katwijk
Harry van der Molen
Anne-Marie Vreman
Dinand Ekkel
Marga Vermue-Vermue
Arinda Callewaert-de Groot
Olger van Dijk
Marijn Noordam
Frank van Kuppeveld
Monique Smidt-Beudeker
Gerben Karssenberg
Patricia Assmann
Daniëlle van Lith-Woestenberg
Jobke Vonk-Vedder
Jan Folkert Deinum
Marja Kwast
Jan Kramer
David Moolenburgh
Maarten Offinga
Elsa Rijssenbeek-van Pijkeren
Guus Mulders
Martijn de Haas
Mona Keijzer
Erik van den Oord
Brigit Homan
Erna van de Ven
Clazinus Netjes
Sjoerd Meulensteen
Willem Ketelaars
Marij Cox Sevenich
Peter Ruys
Rex Arendsen
Yang Soo Kloosterhof

GroenLinks
 Femke Halsema – 577,126
 Jolande Sap – 8,451
 Tofik Dibi – 6,089
 Mariko Peters – 3,988
 Ineke van Gent – 7,215
 Liesbeth van Tongeren – 2,637
 Jesse Klaver – 2,466
 Bruno Braakhuis – 879
 Arjan El Fassed – 1,262
 Linda Voortman – 1,664
 Rik Grashoff – 990
 Niels van den Berge – 596
 Natasja van den Berg – 858
 Bert van Boggelen – 514
 Carla van Os – 643
 Hann van Schendel – 502
 Arno Uijlenhoet – 289
 Ruard Ganzevoort – 869
 Nadya van Putten – 1,729
 Ahmed Harika – 1,343
 Hayat Barrahmun – 1,606
 Paul Smeulders – 345
 Gon Mevis – 527
 René Kerkwijk – 377
 Isabelle Diks – 771
 Leen Harpe – 275
 Irona Groeneveld – 615
 Jan Wijnia – 708
 Tof Thissen – 874
 Kathalijne Buitenweg – 1,888

Labour Party
 Job Cohen
 Nebahat Albayrak
 Ronald Plasterk
 Mariëtte Hamer
 Jeroen Dijsselbloem
 Jetta Klijnsma
 Diederik Samsom
 Gerdi Verbeet
 Frans Timmermans
 Sharon Dijksma
 Hans Spekman
 Angelien Eijsink
 Martijn van Dam
 Attje Kuiken
 Ahmed Marcouch
 Roos Vermeij
 Ed Groot
 Sjoera Dikkers
 Pierre Heijnen
 Lea Bouwmeester
 Jeroen Recourt
 Agnes Wolbert
 Eelke van der Veen
 Pauline Smeets
 Metin Çelik
 Lutz Jacobi
 Tjeerd van Dekken
 Tanja Jadnanansing
 Jacques Monasch
 Khadija Arib
 Jeroen de Lange
 Myrthe Hilkens
 John Leerdam
 Margot Kraneveldt
 Mohammed Mohandis
 Lia Roefs
 Jan Boelhouwer
 Mei Li Vos
 Henk Nijboer
 Anja Timmer
 Paul Kalma
 Brigitte Troost
 Jan Vos
 Marianne Besselink
 Wouter Neerings
 Keklik Yücel
 Serv Wiemers
 Saskia Laper-ter Stege
 Hans Spigt
 Marije van den Berg
 Thijs Reuten
 Ria Oonk
 Sander Terphuis
 Chantal Gill'ard
 Hans Adriani
 Loes Ypma
 Ard van der Tuuk
 Patricia Linhard
 Meint Helder
 Grace Tanamal
 Inge Polstra
 Gülhan Akdemir
 Joyce Vermue
 Karin Hazewinkel
 Martientje Kuitenbrouwer
 Maarten Divendal
 Marijke Drees
 Jan Hamming
 Hedy d'Ancona
 Lodewijk de Waal

Party for Freedom
Geert Wilders
Fleur Agema
Lilian Helder
Raymond de Roon
Martin Bosma
Sietse Fritsma
Teun van Dijck
Louis Bontes
Dion Graus
Richard de Mos
Hero Brinkman
Eric Lucassen
Roland van Vliet
Johan Driessen
Karen Gerbrands
Joram van Klaveren
Marcial Hernandez
Willie Dille
Léon de Jong
Harm Beertema
James Sharpe
Wim Kortenoeven
Jhim van Bemmel
André Elissen
Ino van den Besselaar
Auke Zijlstra
Alexander Kops
Jasper van Koppen
Olav Spierings
Edgar Mulder
Vicky Maeijer
Marjolein Faber
Marissa Visser
Marc van den Berg
Monica Nunes
Vincent van Haaren
Pascal Romeijn
Marjolein van de Waal
René Eekhuis
Ron Dubbelman
Toon van Dijk
Machiel de Graaf
Arnoud van Doorn
Laurens van Delft
Menno Ludriks
Chris van der Helm
Barry Madlener
Gom van Strien

People's Party for Freedom and Democracy
Mark Rutte
Edith Schippers
Fred Teeven
Jeanine Hennis-Plasschaert
Stef Blok
Paul de Krom
Frans Weekers
Atzo Nicolaï
Charlie Aptroot
Betty de Boer
Halbe Zijlstra
Anouchka van Miltenburg
Han ten Broeke
Ineke Dezentjé Hamming-Bluemink
Willibrord van Beek
Cora van Nieuwenhuizen
Janneke Snijder-Hazelhoff
Malik Azmani
Helma Neppérus
Ton Elias
Mark Harbers
Brigitte van der Burg
Tamara Venrooy-Van Ark
Anne Mulder
Erik Ziengs
Ard van der Steur
Klaas Dijkhoff
Helma Lodders
Anne-Wil Lucas-Smeerdijk
André Bosman
Afke Schaart
René Leegte
Karin Straus
Joost Taverne
Johan Houwers
Bart de Liefde
Matthijs Huizing
Ingrid de Caluwé
Ybeltje Berckmoes-Duindam
Bart Keuper
Alexander Dalenoort
Aukje de Vries
Jeroen van Wijngaarden
Pieter van Woensel
Ronald Vuijk
Monique Belinfante-van Gelder
Onno Aerden
Jeroen Diepemaat
Paul Laudy
Jeltje Hoekstra-Sikkema
Jakob Bartelds
Roald van der Linde
Tanja Haseloop-Amsing
Henk de Vlaming
Christhophe van der Maat
Daan de Neef
Johan-Pieter Verwey
Bernd Roks
Kamran Ullah
Tatjana Sormaz
Petra Borst
Eric van den Dungen
Frits Paymans
Jan Willem Pieters
Alex van Pelt
Laura Werger
Erwin Hoogland
Hans Aeijelts Averink
Frank Verveld
Erik Koppe
Jan Verhoeven
Kees Gillis
Herman van Santen

Socialist Party
Emile Roemer
Harry van Bommel
Jan de Wit
Renske Leijten
Ronald van Raak
Ewout Irrgang
Sadet Karabulut
Paul Ulenbelt
Jasper van Dijk
Sharon Gesthuizen
Henk van Gerven
Manja Smits
Paulus Jansen
Farshad Bashir
Nine Kooiman
Rik Janssen
Nico Heijmans
Hans van Leeuwen
Arnout Hoekstra
Jessica van Ruitenberg
Krista van Velzen
Ron Meyer
Maarten Hijink
Nicole van Gemert
Michiel van Nispen
Fons Luijben
Gerrie Elfrink
Jos van der Horst
Hennie Hemmes
Hilde van der Molen
Mariska ten Heuw
Marianne Langkamp
Jules Iding
Remine Alberts-Oosterbaan
Theo Coşkun
Tonnie Wouters
Riet de Wit-Romans
Bernard Gerard
Jan Broekema
Frans Mulckhuijse
Saïd Afalah
Jeroen Brouwer
Willy Lourenssen
Willem Bouman
Ingrid Gyömörei-Agelink
Wim van Gammeren
Jannie Visscher
Sibel Özoğul-Özen
Bart Vermeulen
Lies van Aelst

2010 elections in the Netherlands